Myer Bloom,  (7 December 1928 – 9 February 2016) was a Canadian physicist, specializing in the theory and applications of Nuclear magnetic resonance.

Education and career
Bloom was born into a Jewish family in Montreal in 1928. After secondary education at Baron Byng High School,  Bloom received in 1949 his B.S. and in 1950 his M.S. from McGill University. In 1954 he received his Ph.D. from the University of Illinois at Urbana–Champaign under Charles Slichter with thesis Magnetic Induction in Nuclear Quadrupole Resonance. Bloom was supported by an NRC Travelling Postdoctoral Fellowship at Leiden University from 1954 to 1956. At the University of British Columbia, he was a research associate in 1956–1957, an assistant professor in 1957–1960, an associate professor in 1960–1963, a full professor in 1963–1994, and professor emeritus from 1995 until his death. He was a visiting professor at Harvard University, Kyoto University, the University of Paris Sud, the University of Rome, and the Danish Technical University.

With Karl Erdman, Bloom collaborated on the transverse Stern–Gerlach experiment.

Legacy
He had a wife Margaret Patricia Bloom (née Holmes), a son David Bloom, and a daughter Margot Bloom. He published in 2014 a book of personal recollections Lucky Hazards: My Life in Physics.

Awards and honours
Sloan Fellow (1961–1965)
Fellow of the American Physical Society (elected 1962)
Guggenheim Fellow (1964–1965)
Steacie Prize (1967)
Fellow of the Royal Society of Canada (elected 1968)
Jacob Biely Faculty Research Prize of UBC (1969)
Canadian Association of Physicists Gold Medal (1973)
Izaak Walton Killam Memorial Prize for Natural Sciences (1995)

See also
Pake doublet

References

1928 births
2016 deaths
Jewish Canadian scientists
20th-century Canadian physicists
21st-century Canadian physicists
McGill University Faculty of Science alumni
Grainger College of Engineering alumni
Fellows of the Royal Society of Canada
Fellows of the American Physical Society
Academic staff of the University of British Columbia Faculty of Science